The 1949 UCI Track Cycling World Championships were the World Championship for track cycling. They took place in Copenhagen, Denmark from 22 to 28 August 1949. Five events for men were contested, 3 for professionals and 2 for amateurs.

Medal summary

Medal table

See also
 1949 UCI Road World Championships

References

Track cycling
UCI Track Cycling World Championships by year
International cycle races hosted by Denmark
International sports competitions in Copenhagen
1949 in track cycling